Harris Peak is a peak,  high, surmounting the base of Reclus Peninsula on the west coast of Graham Land, Antarctica. It was mapped by the Falkland Islands Dependencies Survey (FIDS) from photos taken by Hunting Aerosurveys Ltd in 1956–57, and was named by the UK Antarctic Place-Names Committee in 1960 for Leslie Harris, a FIDS carpenter and general assistant at the Danco Island station in 1956, who participated in the reconnaissance journeys from that station and from the nearby Portal Point hut.

References

Mountains of Graham Land
Danco Coast